Eli Jon Lake is an American journalist and the former senior national security correspondent for The Daily Beast and Newsweek.  Currently, he is a columnist for the Bloomberg View.  He has also contributed to CNN, Fox, C-SPAN, Charlie Rose, the I Am Rapaport: Stereo Podcast and Bloggingheads.tv.

Early life and education
Lake was born in Philadelphia to a Jewish family and graduated from Trinity College in Hartford, Connecticut, in 1994.

Career
Lake began as national security reporter at the New York Sun and as State Department correspondent for United Press International (UPI).

In 2011 at Newsweek/The Daily Beast, Lake reported on how the Obama administration sold Israel powerful bunker buster bombs. In 2012, reporting from Somalia, Lake found a local prison that received Somalis captured by the U.S. Navy and later disclosed how the United Nations documented U.S. violations of an arms embargo in Somalia to funding some of the regional governments there.

Lake was one of the first reporters to challenge the Obama administration's initial claims in 2012 that the 9-11 anniversary attack on the U.S. mission in Benghazi was not connected to al Qaeda.

In 2013, Lake disclosed how court documents in the U.S. government challenge to Blackwater (now Academi) showed that the organization was an extension of the CIA after 9-11.

He was a contributing editor for The New Republic between 2008 and 2013. Lake joined The Daily Beast following The New Republic as Senior National Security Correspondent. Lake along with his colleague Josh Rogin left The Daily Beast in October 2014 and joined Bloomberg View.

Criticism 
Ken Silverstein, one of Lake's primary critics, has claimed his past sources lacked credibility and been used to manipulate the discourse on national security. Silverstein accused Lake's reporting of supporting WMDs prior to the invasion of Iraq. Silverstein cited an article that Lake had written in 2006 during the war in Iraq.

In 2011, Silverstein wrote an article for Salon claiming that Lake's reporting on Georgia was biased because pro-Georgian lobbyists had paid for his meals and drinks in the past. This report was disputed by Ben Smith on Politico. Silverstein implied that Lake's relationship with these lobbyists influenced his original report of a bomb blast near the U.S. Embassy in Tbilisi. That story was confirmed by The New York Times. Both pieces come to the same conclusion that a Russian military intelligence officer was implicated by Georgian and U.S. authorities in the bombing. Lake has publicly stated he has always paid his tab whenever meeting with Georgian sources.

In August 2013, along with Josh Rogin, Lake reported on a CIA intercept that claimed that Al Qaeda had a meeting of senior leaders in the form of a conference call. Silverstein criticized their work as misreporting for using the term "conference call" when a later article clarified the call as a remote meeting via internet video, voice conference and chat. Speculation about to the differences in the initial reports ranged from glorification of the NSA''s abilities to protection of sources within the U.S. intelligence community.

In March 2017, Lake quoted House Intelligence Committee Chairman Devin Nunes saying that an intelligence officer had shown him intelligence reports that allegedly included inappropriate details about the Trump transition team's communications. Lake later acknowledged that Nunes had "misled" him and that the reports had in fact been given to Nunes by a White House staffer, raising questions about whether Nunes' investigation was truly independent of the White House.

References

External links 
 Eli Lake Twitter Profile
 Archive from the Bloomberg View archive
 Archive from The Daily Beast archive
 Archive from the New York Sun archive
 Eli Lake forum Reddit archive
 

Jack M. Barrack Hebrew Academy alumni
Living people
American political commentators
Jewish American journalists
American reporters and correspondents
The New York Sun people
Bloomberg L.P. people
The Washington Times people
1972 births
21st-century American Jews